Quercus convallata is a species of plant in the family Fagaceae. It is endemic to Mexico. It is placed in section Quercus.

References

convallata
Endemic flora of Mexico
Endemic oaks of Mexico
Flora of the Sierra Madre Occidental
Trees of Durango
Trees of Jalisco
Trees of Nayarit
Trees of Zacatecas
Taxonomy articles created by Polbot
Taxa named by William Trelease